Mount Jewett is a borough in McKean County, Pennsylvania, United States. The population was 849 at the 2020 census. The students of the borough attend school in the Kane Area School District, even though the borough is surrounded by Hamlin Township—belonging to neighboring Smethport Area School District. Mount Jewett is near to the Kinzua Bridge State Park, which includes the Kinzua Bridge Sky Walk and Kinzua Viaduct. The current mayor is Brianna Howard.

Geography
Mount Jewett is located at  (41.724788, -78.643702).

According to the United States Census Bureau, the borough has a total area of 2.4 square miles (6.2 km2), all  land.

Mount Jewett is tied with Callimont for the title of being the fifth-highest, in elevation, of towns in Pennsylvania, at 2240 feet.

Climate
This climatic region is typified by large seasonal temperature differences, with warm to hot (and often humid) summers and cold (sometimes severely cold) winters.  According to the Köppen Climate Classification system, Mount Jewett has a humid continental climate, abbreviated "Dfb" on climate maps.

Demographics

As of the census of 2000, there were 1,070 people, 444 households, and 305 families residing in the borough. The population density was 449.1 people per square mile (173.6/km2). There were 504 housing units at an average density of 211.5 per square mile (81.8/km2). The racial makeup of the borough was 99.53% White, 0.28% Native American, 0.09% Asian, and 0.09% from two or more races. Hispanic or Latino of any race were 0.19% of the population.

There were 444 households, out of which 34.7% had children under the age of 18 living with them, 50.7% were married couples living together, 12.8% had a female householder with no husband present, and 31.1% were non-families. 27.7% of all households were made up of individuals, and 12.6% had someone living alone who was 65 years of age or older. The average household size was 2.41 and the average family size was 2.90.

In the borough the population was spread out, with 27.1% under the age of 18, 7.5% from 18 to 24, 30.2% from 25 to 44, 20.7% from 45 to 64, and 14.6% who were 65 years of age or older. The median age was 35 years. For every 100 females there were 95.6 males. For every 100 females age 18 and over, there were 90.7 males.

The median income for a household in the borough was $32,583, and the median income for a family was $40,147. Males had a median income of $30,189 versus $22,833 for females. The per capita income for the borough was $17,056. About 12.8% of families and 14.3% of the population were below the poverty line, including 20.5% of those under age 18 and 6.2% of those age 65 or over.

Local Interests

The Kinzua Bridge State Park is located just a few miles north of Mount Jewett's borough line. It was used to carry trains across the Kinzua valley overlooking the town of Kushequa, Pennsylvania. Originally constructed in 1882, the structure was the highest iron bridge in the world. In 1900 it was turned into a steel structure. Upon becoming a state park an independent company used the bridge to carry sight seers and tourists across the valley in an old steam locomotive. On July 21, 2003 a tornado destroyed a large portion of the bridge.  Now all that remains is a portion of the bridge and a small section of railroad track at each end of the valley. In another devastating blow, on early Sunday March 16, 2008 the locomotives used to carry sightseers across the Kinzua Bridge were severely damaged by a fire set by arsonists.  The fire, which burned the Biddle Street building used to house the trains in Kane, Pennsylvania caused $1 million in damage. The residents of Mount Jewett would watch the train daily as it passed through town—directly to the north of the borough building. This further dampened the dream of rebuilding the bridge.

The state decided not to rebuild the Kinzua Bridge, which would have cost an estimated $45 million. Instead, the ruins were to become a visitor attraction used to show the forces of nature at work. Kinzua Bridge State Park had attracted 215,000 visitors annually before the bridge collapsed, and was one of twenty state parks chosen by the Pennsylvania Bureau of Parks for its list of "Twenty Must-See Pennsylvania State Parks". The viaduct and its collapse were featured in the History Channel's Life After People as an example of how corrosion and high winds would eventually lead to the collapse of any steel structure.
 
The Knox and Kane Railroad was forced to suspend operations in October 2004 after a 75 percent decline in the number of passengers, brought about by the collapse of the Kinzua Bridge. The Kovalchick Corporation bought the Knox and Kane's tracks and all other property owned by the railroad, including the locomotives and rolling stock. The Kovalchick Corporation also owns the East Broad Top Railroad and was the company that owned the Kinzua Bridge before selling it to the state in 1963.
 
Pennsylvania released $700,000 to design repairs on the remaining towers and plan development of the new park facilities in June 2005. In late 2005, the Pennsylvania Department of Conservation and Natural Resources (DCNR) put forward an $8 million proposal for a new observation deck and visitors' center, with plans to allow access to the bridge and a hiking trail giving views of the fallen towers. The Kinzua Sky Walk was opened on September 15, 2011 in a ribbon-cutting ceremony. The Sky Walk consists of a pedestrian walkway to an observation deck with a glass floor at the end of bridge that allows views of bridge and the valley directly below. The walkway cost $4.3 million to construct, but is estimated to bring in $11.5 million in tourism revenue for the region.

 Mount Jewett made world news in February 2001 when an explosion at the Temple Inland particle board plant killed several workers and injured many more
 The population of Mount Jewett includes a significant number of people with Swedish ancestry. Every August the town celebrates this history with their well-known "Swedish Festival." The August 2010 celebration was the 40th annual Swedish Festival in Mount Jewett and the 2021 celebration will be the 50th because the 2020 event was cancelled due to the global COVID-19 pandemic.
 Mount Jewett was named for Hugh Judge Jewett, who was president of the New York, Lake Erie and Western Railroad when it brought rail service to the area. Previously it had been known as Howard Hill, after Howard, New York.

References

Populated places established in 1893
Boroughs in McKean County, Pennsylvania
1893 establishments in Pennsylvania